Notholaena hookeri is a species name, which may refer to:

Argyrochosma chilensis, described in 1856 as Notholaena hookeri E.J.Lowe
Notholaena standleyi, described in 1879 as Notholaena hookeri D.C.Eaton

hookeri